The Monsanto Tower is a  skyscraper in Oeiras, a town and municipality to the west of Lisbon which is part of the Portuguese capital's urban agglomeration. Finished in 2001, the 17-floor building is the second tallest in Portugal, and the tallest in Lisbon. Lisbon-based architectural firm Sua Kay Architects designed the  office building.

See also
List of tallest buildings in Portugal
List of tallest structures in Portugal
List of tallest buildings in Lisbon

References

Skyscrapers in Portugal
Commercial buildings completed in 2001
Buildings and structures in Oeiras, Portugal